Kushabhadra River forms the complex of river systems which form the distributaries of the Mahanadi River. It branches off from the Kuakhai River, which is a distributary of the Mahanadi, at Balianta and flows in a south western direction towards Nimapara and Gop for 46–50 miles before sinking into the Bay of Bengal near Ramachandi Temple, 15 miles east of Puri in the Puri District of Odisha.

Dhanua River is its main tributary, bringing in water to its parent body.

References

External links
 

Rivers of Odisha
Tributaries of the Mahanadi River
Rivers of India